Angelo M. Scaccia is an American state legislator who formerly served in the Massachusetts House of Representatives. He is a Readville resident and a member of the Democratic Party.

See also
 2019–2020 Massachusetts legislature

References

Living people
Democratic Party members of the Massachusetts House of Representatives
Politicians from Boston
21st-century American politicians
Year of birth missing (living people)